The Renderers are a New Zealand band from Christchurch formed in 1989 by Maryrose Crook and her husband Brian (of The Terminals).

History
The Renderers released their debut album, Trail of Tears, in 1991 on Flying Nun Records. They produced seven further albums. Brian Crook also recorded a solo album in 1999 (Bathysphere). Their eighth album, In the Sodium Light, was released in January 2016.

Discography

Albums

Singles
"Bigger than Texas" (1990), Flying Nun
"Touch of Evil" (1992), Flying Nun
"Million Lights" (1993), Merge

References

External links

AudioCulture profile

New Zealand indie rock groups
Flying Nun Records artists
Drag City (record label) artists
Musical groups established in 1989
People from Christchurch
Ajax Records artists
Siltbreeze Records artists